Events from the year 1587 in art.

Events
 Statue of Trajan is replaced, by order of Pope Sixtus V, with the statue of Saint Peter on the Column of Trajan.

Paintings

Matteo Perez d'Aleccio - Saint Christopher (Church of San Miguel, Seville)
Francken – Jesus among the Doctors

Births
April 26 (baptized) - Abraham van der Haagen, Dutch painter (died 1639)
May - Esaias van de Velde, Dutch landscape painter (died 1630)
December 8 (bapt.) - Martin Ryckaert, Flemish landscape painter (died 1631)
date unknown
Francesco Allegrini da Gubbio, Italian painter of the Baroque period (died 1663)
Matteo Ingoli, Italian painter of the early-Baroque period (died 1631)
Claes Jansz. Visscher, Dutch genre painter (died 1652)
probable
George Jamesone, Scottish portrait painter (died 1644)
Filippo Napoletano, Italian artist of diverse paintings of exotic soldiers, skeletons of animals, or cityscapes (died 1629
Bartolomé Román, Spanish Baroque painter known for his series of archangels (died 1647)
Giovanni Battista Vanni, Italian painter and engraver (died 1660)

Deaths
May 3 - Lelio Orsi, Italian Renaissance painter of the Reggio Emilia school (born 1511)
September 25 - Giovanni Battista Fontana, Italian painter and engraver (born 1524)
date unknown
Giovanni Anastasi, Italian painter (born 1540)
Lazzaro Calvi, Italian painter who frequently collaborated with his brother (born 1512)
Antonio Campi, Italian painter (born 1522)
Annibale Fontana, Italian sculptor and medallist (born 1540)
Giovanni Battista della Marca, Italian painter (born 1532)
Plautilla Nelli, Italian painter (born 1523)
Juan Valverde de Amusco, Italian anatomist and engraver (born 1525)
probable - Caterina van Hemessen, Flemish Renaissance  painter (b. 1528)

References

 
Years of the 16th century in art